is a 1984 26-episode anime television series. Directed by Yoshikazu Yasuhiko, produced by Sunrise and was broadcast in on TV Tokyo.

Plot
In 1990, an island emerged about two thousand kilometers south-east of the country of Samoa. It was named New Austral Island because of its close proximity to Austral Island. However, due to a secret concerning the new landmass, an organization called GAIL covered up its existence. Though absent from the map, it was still very much afloat. As part of the cover-up, Dr. Tagami, a university professor obsessed with the island, was killed.

In his will, he instructed his son, Yuu Tagami to meet with his former student, Dr. Wave, in New York. Shortly after he arrives, he, Dr. Wave, Doris (Dr. Wave's sister), and their dog, Argos, are attacked by GAIL. They escape with the help of Skipper, an old friend of Dr. Wave's who Doris describes as “a bad guy.” With Skipper's help, they make their way to Austral Island, though not without trouble. There Yuu is saved by a seemingly sentient robot called Gorg that the locals believe is the island's protector. The story unfolds from there, as Yuu, Gorg, and their friends try to uncover the secrets of New Austral Island while fighting off the forces of GAIL.

Cast

Release
In 2001, Bandai announced that they would start a new sub label under the title Sunrise Classic Action, in which Giant Gorg would be part of. However, the plan was later scrapped.

In 2015, Discotek Media announced that they had licensed the series for a North American release on DVD.

References

External links
Official Sunrise Giant Gorg website 

1984 anime television series debuts
Action anime and manga
Discotek Media
Mecha anime and manga
Shōnen manga
Sunrise (company)